Lazar Baranovych or Baranovich (1620 – 3 (13) September 1693 in Chernihiv, Tsardom of Russia) was a Ruthenian Eastern Orthodox archbishop of the Polish–Lithuanian Commonwealth and then of the Tsardom of Russia.

Early life
Ecclesiastical, political, and literary figure, professor (1650) and rector of the Kyiv-Mohyla Academy.

Career
He founded schools and monasteries. While he supported the incorporation of left-bank Ukraine into the Tsardom of Russia, he also defended the independence of the Kiev metropolis to the Patriarch of Moscow. He was the Bishop of Chernihiv from 1657. In 1658, when the presence of Muscovite troops forced Metropolitan Balaban to move his episcopal seat to Chyhyryn, the government in Moscow appointed Baranovych in his place.

In 1661, Pitirim of Moscow, who at that time was the Metropolitan of Krutitsy and the deputy of the Patriarch of Moscow, ordained Methodius Fylymonovych as Bishop of Mstsislaw. Fylymonovych was later appointed as Baranovych's vicar of the Metropolis of Kiev. In 1662, Patriarch Nikon of Moscow cursed Metropolitan Pitirim for this act. The Patriarch of Constantinople also pronounced anathema on Methodius. As a result, the Ukrainian clergy refused to obey the new vicar. This first attempt by Moscow to directly nominate a candidate for the throne in Kiev resulted in failure. 

In 1674 he established a printing house at the Monastery of Holy Transfiguration in Novhorod-Severskyi, which in 1679 was moved to Chernihiv. In 1667, at a local Council in Moscow, a decision was made to elevate the Chernihiv diocese to an archdiocese with Lazar Baranovych as archbishop. However, since the decision was made without the consent of Constantinople, Patriarch Parthenius IV of Constantinople did not recognize its legitimacy. Baranovych may have assumed the title of "Metropolitan of Kiev, Galicia and all Ruthenia" or locum tenens in pretence.

Publications
The publications of his sermons, written in a baroque style in Church Slavonic language, include: 
 Mech dukhovny (The Spiritual Sword, 1666); and 
 Truby sloves propovidnykh (The Trumpets of Preaching Words, 1674). 
He is the author of several polemical works against Catholicism in Polish and Church Slavonic (see also Polemical literature); of a poetry collection in Polish, Lutnia Apollinowa (Apollo's Lute, 1671); and of a large correspondence. Among other things, Lutnia Apollinowa contains six epitaphs for Metropolitan Peter Mohyla.

References 

 Baranovych, Lazar at the Encyclopedia of Ukraine
 Лазар Баранович
 [in Ukrainian] Лазар Баранович, архієп. Нагробки митрополиту Петру Могилі / Переклад зі старопольської, вступна стаття та коментарі архім. Митрофана (Божка) // Труди Київської Духовної Академії. — №37. — К.: Київська духовна академія і семінарія, 2022. — С.140–147.

Eastern Orthodox bishops of Kyiv
1693 deaths
17th-century Ukrainian people
Year of birth unknown
Baroque writers
National University of Kyiv-Mohyla Academy alumni
Academic staff of the National University of Kyiv-Mohyla Academy
Bishops of Chernihiv
Metropolitans of Kiev and all Rus' (claimed or partially recognised)